Hemopoietic growth factors regulate the differentiation and proliferation of particular progenitor cells. Made available through recombinant DNA technology, they hold tremendous potential for medical uses when a person's natural ability to form blood cells is diminished or defective.  Recombinant erythropoietin (EPO) is very effective in treating the diminished red blood cell production that accompanies end-stage kidney disease.   Erythropoietin is a sialoglycoprotein hormone produced by peritubular cells of kidney

Granulocyte-macrophage colony-stimulating factor and granulocyte CSF are given to stimulate white blood cell formation in cancer patients who are receiving chemotherapy, which tends to kill their red bone marrow cells as well as the cancer cells.  Thrombopoietin shows great promise for preventing platelet depletion during chemotherapy.  CSFs and thrombopoietin also improve the outcome of patients who receive bone marrow transplants.

See also
 Colony-stimulating factor

References

Hematopoiesis
Growth factors